Evgeny Vadimovich Sedov (born 29 January 1996) is a Russian competitive swimmer. Sedov and his teammates won the gold medal in the 4×50 m freestyle relay at the 2014 short course world championships in Doha, breaking the world record. Together with his teammates, he also broke the 4×50 meter medley relay world record in the heats, but this record was broken in the final by Brazil. He is the current junior world record holder in the 50 meter butterfly (long course).

At the 2015 European Short Course Championships Sedov won his first international senior medal in an individual event, winning the gold medal in the 50 meter freestyle, 0.05 ahead of Marco Orsi of Italy.

References

1996 births
Living people
Russian male swimmers
Russian male freestyle swimmers
Medalists at the FINA World Swimming Championships (25 m)
World record holders in swimming